Mahatma Gandhi: 20th Century Prophet is a 1953 American documentary film directed by Stanley Neal and written by Quentin Reynolds. The documentary follows the life of Mahatma Gandhi. The film was released on April 28, 1953, by United Artists.

Synopsis

See also
 List of artistic depictions of Mahatma Gandhi

References

External links 
 

1953 films
Black-and-white documentary films
1953 documentary films
United Artists films
Documentary films about India
Documentary films about revolutionaries
Documentary films about politicians
American black-and-white films
Films about Mahatma Gandhi
American documentary films
1950s English-language films
1950s American films